Three ships of the Royal Navy have borne the name HMS Waveney, after the River Waveney:

  was a  launched in 1903 and sold in 1920.
  was a  launched in 1942 and broken up in 1947.
  was a  launched in 1983. She was sold to the Bangladesh Navy in 1994 and was renamed Shapla.

Royal Navy ship names